Titanoeca brunnea is a species of true spider in the family Titanoecidae. It is found in the United States and Canada.

References

Titanoecidae
Articles created by Qbugbot
Spiders described in 1888